Theodore is a masculine given name. It comes from the Ancient Greek name Θεόδωρος (Theódoros), meaning "gift of God(s)" (from the Ancient Greek words θεός, (theós) "God/Gods" and δῶρον (dṓron) "gift". The name was borne by several figures in ancient Greece, such as Theodorus of Samos and Theodorus of Byzantium, but gained popularity due to the rise of Christendom. 

In any form, it means "God(s)-given", or "gift of God/Gods", as do the given names Jonathan, Nathaniel, Matthew, Ataullah, Devadatta, Dosetai, Bogdan, and Adeodatus.

The name has risen in popularity across the Anglosphere in recent years. Theodore was among the five most popular names for White newborn boys in the American state of Virginia in 2022.  It was among the ten most popular names for newborn boys nationally in the United States in 2021.
The feminine form of Theodore is Theodora. The names Dorothy and Godiva also mean "gift of God(s)". In German, Theodore is the feminine form and the masculine form is Theodor.

Although similar to, and probably influenced by it, the Germanic name Theodoric (and variants Theodoricus, Dietrich, Thierry, and others) has a separate origin.

Variants

Diminutives
Hypocorisms, calling names, or nicknames derived from Theodore can be:

People named Theodore

Ancient world
Ordered chronologically

 Theodore Stratelates (died 319), Byzantine martyr and Warrior Saint
 Theodore of Mopsuestia (c. 350 – 428), Byzantine bishop
 Theodore of Enaton, 5th-century Syrian Christian monk
 Theodore of Pherme, 4th-century Egyptian Christian monk
 Theodore of Tarsus (602–690), Archbishop of Canterbury
 Theodore (brother of Heraclius), Byzantine general
 Theodore Trithyrius (died 636), Byzantine treasurer and military commander
 Pope Theodore I, Pope from 642 to 649
 Theodore I Calliopas, Exarch of Ravenna (643 – c. 645 and 653 – before 666)
 Theodore Abu Qurrah (c. 750 – c. 823), Christian Arab theologian
 Theodore the Studite (759–826), Byzantine Greek monk and abbot
 Pope Theodore II (840–897), Pope in 897
 Theodore Prodromos (c. 1100 – c. 1165), Byzantine writer and poet
 Theodore I Laskaris (c. 1174 – c. 1222), first Emperor of Nicaea 
 Theodore Komnenos Doukas (died c. 1253), Emperor of Thessalonica
 Theodore II Laskaris (c. 1222 – 1258), Emperor of Nicaea
 Theodore Metochites (1270–1332), Byzantine statesman, author and philosopher
 Theodore Svetoslav of Bulgaria, Tsar of Bulgaria from 1300 to 1322
 Theodore I Palaiologos (c. 1355 – 1407), Byzantine despot
 Theodore II Palaiologos (c. 1396 – 1448), Byzantine despot

Modern world
 Ordered by last name, where available; otherwise chronologically
 Theodore I of Corsica (1694–1756), German adventurer who was briefly King of Corsica
 Pope Theodoros II of Alexandria (born 1952), leader of the Coptic Orthodox Church of Alexandria
 Patriarch Theodore II of Alexandria (born 1954), Eastern Orthodox Patriarch of Alexandria and all Africa
 Theodore Bent (1852-1897), British archaeologist and explorer in the Levant, Africa, and Southern Arabia 
 Theodore Beza (1519–1605), French Protestant theologian and scholar
 Theodore Bibliander (1509–1564), Swiss Orientalist, publisher and linguist
 Theodore Bikel (1924–2015), Austrian-American actor, folksinger, composer and unionist
 Teddy Bridgewater (born 1992), American football player
 Theodore Bruback (1851–1904), American businessman
 Theodore Bundy (1946-1989), prolific American serial killer, rapist, kidnapper, and necrophile
 Theodore Cantor (1809–1860), Danish physician, zoologist and botanist
 Theodore Conrad (1910–1994), American architect, preservationist and a leading architectural model maker
 Theodore John Conrad (1949–2021), American fugitive
 Theodore Dreiser (1871–1945), American novelist
 Theodore Farragher (2012-)
 Theodore Freeman (1930–1964), American aeronautical engineer, test pilot and NASA astronaut
 Theodore Frelinghuysen (1787–1862), American politician
 Theodore Fyfe (1875–1945), Scottish architect
 Théodore Géricault (1791-1824), French Romantic painter
 Theodore Gill (1837–1914), American zoologist and librarian
 Theodore Hall (1925–1999), American physicist and atomic spy for the Soviet Union
 Theodore Kaczynski (born 1942), American letter bomber
 Theodore von Kármán (1881–1963), Hungarian-American mathematician, aerospace engineer and physicist
 Theodore Katsanevas (1947–2021), Greek academic and politician
 Theodoros Kolokotronis (1770-1843), Greek General and pre-eminent leader of the Greek War of Independence (1821-1829) against the Ottoman Empire.
 Theodore Levitt (1925–2006), American economist
 Theodore Long (born 1947), American professional wrestling personality
 Theodore Lyman (1874–1954), American physicist and spectroscopist
 Theodore Maiman (1927–2007), American engineer and physicist, inventor of the laser
 Theodore Edgar McCarrick (born 1930), American Cardinal of the Roman Catholic Church
 Ted Nugent (born 1948), American rock musician and gun advocate
 Theodore Odza (1915–1998), American visual artist
 Theodore Braybrooke Panabokke (1909-1989), Sri Lankan Sinhala politician, lawyer, and diplomat
 Theodore Parker (1810–1860), American Transcendentalist and reforming minister of the Unitarian church
 Theodore Duncan Perera, Sri Lankan Sinhala civil servant
 Theodore William Richards (1868–1928), American physical chemist
 Theodore Roberts (1861–1928), American film and stage actor
 Theodore Robinson (1852–1896), American Impressionist painter
 Theodore Roethke (1908–1963), American poet
 Theodore Romzha (1911–1947), Ukrainian Ruthenian Catholic bishop
 Theodore Roosevelt (1858–1919), 26th President of the United States
 Theodore Roosevelt Sr. (1831-1878), American businessman and philanthropist
 Theodore Roosevelt Jr. (1887–1944), American government, business and military leader
 Theodore Roosevelt III (1914-2001), American banker
 Theodore Roosevelt IV  or Theodore Roosevelt V (born 1945), American investment banker
 Theodore Roszak (scholar) (1933–2011), American historian, sociologist and novelist
 Ted Sampley (1946–2009), American POW/MIA activist
 Theodore Schultz (1902–1998), American economist
 Theodore Shapiro (born 1971), American film composer
 Theodore Sorensen (1928–2010), American lawyer, writer, and presidential adviser
 Ted Stevens, American former Senator from Alaska
 Theodore Sturgeon (1918–1985), American science fiction author
 Theodore Tannenwald Jr. (1916–1999), judge of the United States Tax Court
 Theodore Thomas (conductor) (1835–1905), American violinist and conductor
 Theodore Van Kirk (1921–2014), American navigator of the Enola Gay
 Ted Williams (1918–2002), American baseball player
 Teddy Wilson (1912–1986), American jazz pianist
 Theodore H. Winters Jr. (1913–2008), American flying ace during World War II
 Guy Theodore Sebastian, Malaysian-Australian singer
 Theodore Taylor (1921-2006), American writer
 Tewodros II Ge'ez (ዳግማዊ ቴዎድሮስ) (1818–1868), Emperor of Ethiopia from 1855 until his death in 1868

See also
 
 
 Saint Theodore (disambiguation)
 Théodore (disambiguation)
 Theodor, a list of people with the given name
 Theodora (disambiguation)
 Theodore (surname)
 Theodoric
 Theodoros, a list of people with the given name Theodoros or Theodorus
 Teodorico, a list of people with the given name Teodorico or Theodorico
 Teodor
 Theodoor
 Fyodor
 Tawadros (disambiguation)
 Tewodros (disambiguation)
 Tudor (disambiguation)

References

English masculine given names

Greek masculine given names
Norwegian masculine given names
Swedish masculine given names
Danish masculine given names
Dutch masculine given names
German masculine given names
Given names of Greek language origin
Masculine given names
Theophoric names